Strigia is a genus of beetles in the family Carabidae, containing the following species:

 Strigia atra (Chaudoir, 1878)
 Strigia maxillaris Brulle, 1834
 Strigia stigma (Fabricius, 1801)

References

Orthogoniinae